Bill L. Norton is an American film director, writer and producer. Among many projects, he is the writer-director of the cult-classic modern western Cisco Pike.

Career
Norton is most notable as a film director, including his first feature film, the cult-classic Modern Western Cisco Pike in 1972, which he also wrote. He worked as a screenwriter in the 1970s and '80s, writing the scripts for Convoy and Outlaw Blues, among other films.

He also has directed many television series, among them Buffy the Vampire Slayer, Angel, John Doe, Hack,  Las Vegas, Law & Order: Criminal Intent, Lincoln Heights and Roswell.

He is the son of screenwriter William W. Norton, who was convicted in 1986 of importing arms to Northern Ireland for the IRA and the INLA.

Sometimes he is credited as B.W.L. Norton, Bill Norton or William Lloyd Norton.

Filmography

Films

Television

Video Game 

 Law & Order: Criminal Intent (2005, director)

References

External links
 

American cinematographers
American film directors
American male screenwriters
American television directors
Living people
Place of birth missing (living people)
Year of birth missing (living people)